Black Mountain is an 11,797-foot-elevation (3,596 meter) summit located in the Sierra Nevada mountain range, in Mono County of northern California, United States. The mountain is set within the Hoover Wilderness, on the common boundary shared by Inyo National Forest with Humboldt–Toiyabe National Forest, and 1.5 mile outside the boundary of Yosemite National Park. The first ascent of the summit was made in 1905 by George R. Davis, Albert Hale Sylvester, and Pearson Chapman, all with the United States Geological Survey.

Climate
Black Mountain is located in an alpine climate zone. Most weather fronts originate in the Pacific Ocean, and travel east toward the Sierra Nevada mountains. As fronts approach, they are forced upward by the peaks (orographic lift), causing moisture in the form of rain or snowfall to drop onto the range. Precipitation runoff from this mountain drains north into Virginia Creek which is a tributary of the Walker River, and south into Mill Creek which drains to Mono Lake.

See also

 Geology of the Yosemite area

Gallery

References

Mountains of Mono County, California
North American 3000 m summits
Mountains of Northern California
Sierra Nevada (United States)
Humboldt–Toiyabe National Forest
Inyo National Forest